Robert Latta could refer to: 

Robert Allen Latta, known for the 1985 White House intrusion
Bob Latta (born 1956), American politician